Zion Crossroads is an unincorporated community in Louisa and Fluvanna counties of Virginia. It is at the intersections of James Madison Highway (U.S. Route 15) and Three Notch Road (U.S. Route 250). Interstate 64 in Virginia passes one-half mile to the northeast.

History 

When the U.S. Highway System was created in 1928, U.S. Route 250 was originally routed from West Virginia to Ohio. In 1934, the route was expanded southward and eastward to Richmond, Virginia, from West Virginia. The name "Zion Crossroads" was probably created from the nearby Zion United Methodist Church when the new U.S. Route 250 crossed U.S. Route 15 in the 1930s.

Zion Cross Roads was a sleepy little intersection of U.S. Route 15 and U.S. Route 250 with a motel, gas station, restaurant, and grocery store until Interstate 64 in Virginia opened in the early 1970s.  Gas stations, convenience stores and fast food eateries soon developed from the interstate.  Louisa County, Virginia made huge improvements to the infrastructure and the area developed in the early 2000s into a major retail and business center to include the Walmart Distribution Center, hotels, restaurants, and the Spring Creek Golf Community development.  A major improvement to the traffic flow of the area was made when a Diverging diamond interchange was completed by the Virginia Department of Transportation in 2014.

The Fluvanna County water tower just south of the county line had the 10th best water tower art from a poll by Tnemec in 2020. The art has also become Fluvanna County's new county logo.

Landmarks 
About 2½ miles north is Green Springs National Historic Landmark District, a U.S. National Historic Landmark.

References

Unincorporated communities in Louisa County, Virginia
Unincorporated communities in Fluvanna County, Virginia
Unincorporated communities in Virginia